Mark Cross (born 1955, Auckland), is a contemporary artist and painter from New Zealand. His works are held in museums and galleries in New Zealand.

Early life and career 
Mark Cross was born in 1955 in Auckland. He started his painting career when he was in his twenties. At the age of 23, he moved with his family to Liku, Niue. In order to find a market for his work, he returned to New Zealand in 1982. Employing elements of the natural landscape, foreshore imagery and the human figure, his artwork imparts an ecological message regarding the human condition and its relationship with the environment.  In collaboration with other artists, he founded the Hikulagi Sculpture Park in Niue's rainforest in 1996. In collaboration with the author Brad Matsen, he co-authored the book Have We Offended?, a collection of Mark Cross' work, produced by the John Leech Gallery

Selected exhibitions

Solo 
 2013: Sienna Palette, Pierre Peetwers Gallery
 2012: Works in Transit, Pierre Peeters Gallery, Auckland.
 2005: Sheep Country., Real Gallery, Auckland
 2004: Heta: Power and Fragility, Photographs SOCA gallery Auckland and the Whangarei Art Museum
 2003: Recent Works, John Leech Gallery, Auckland
 2002: Have We Offended, Te Manawa, Museum and Art Gallery, Palmerston North
 2002: Cook Islands National Museum, Cook Islands
 1998: Haleiwa Gallery, Hawaii
 1997: Woodcuts, John Leech Gallery, Auckland
 1996: Premier Gallery, Hawaii
 1995: Life Stills, John Leech Gallery, Auckland
 1993: Anomalies, John Leech Gallery, Auckland
 1991:  John Leech Gallery, Auckland

Group 
 2010: Connect Gallery, Wil, Switzerland
 2003: Exiles in Paradise, With Mahiriki Tangaroa, Beachcomber Gallery, Rarotonga
 2002: Tulana Mahu Installation, Cook Island National Museum
 2000: Tulana Mahu Installation, Sydney Olympic Arts Festival, Australia
 1995: Drawings; Joint exhibition with John Pule, The Lane Gallery, Aucklandv
 1996: Nukututaha: Art From Niue, The Lane Gallery Auckland
 1993-1994: Real Vision; Robert McDougall Art Gallery, Christchurc

References 

New Zealand painters
Living people
1955 births
Artists from Auckland